A base pair (bp) is a fundamental unit of double-stranded nucleic acids consisting of two nucleobases bound to each other by hydrogen bonds.  They form the building blocks of the DNA double helix and contribute to the folded structure of both DNA and RNA. Dictated by specific hydrogen bonding patterns, "Watson–Crick" (or "Watson–Crick–Franklin") base pairs (guanine–cytosine and adenine–thymine) allow the DNA helix to maintain a regular helical structure that is subtly dependent on its nucleotide sequence. The complementary nature of this based-paired structure provides a redundant copy of the genetic information encoded within each strand of DNA. The regular structure and data redundancy provided by the DNA double helix make DNA well suited to the storage of genetic information, while base-pairing between DNA and incoming nucleotides provides the mechanism through which DNA polymerase replicates DNA and RNA polymerase transcribes DNA into RNA. Many DNA-binding proteins can recognize specific base-pairing patterns that identify particular regulatory regions of genes.

Intramolecular base pairs can occur within single-stranded nucleic acids. This is particularly important in RNA molecules (e.g., transfer RNA), where Watson–Crick base pairs (guanine–cytosine and adenine–uracil) permit the formation of short double-stranded helices, and a wide variety of non–Watson–Crick interactions (e.g., G–U or A–A) allow RNAs to fold into a vast range of specific three-dimensional structures. In addition, base-pairing between transfer RNA (tRNA) and messenger RNA (mRNA) forms the basis for the molecular recognition events that result in the nucleotide sequence of mRNA becoming translated into the amino acid sequence of proteins via the genetic code.

The size of an individual gene or an organism's entire genome is often measured in base pairs because DNA is usually double-stranded. Hence, the number of total base pairs is equal to the number of nucleotides in one of the strands (with the exception of non-coding single-stranded regions of telomeres). The haploid human genome (23 chromosomes) is estimated to be about 3.2 billion bases long and to contain 20,000–25,000 distinct protein-coding genes. A kilobase (kb) is a unit of measurement in molecular biology equal to 1000 base pairs of DNA or RNA. The total number of DNA base pairs on Earth is estimated at 5.0 with a weight of 50 billion tonnes. In comparison, the total mass of the biosphere has been estimated to be as much as 4 TtC (trillion tons of carbon).

Hydrogen bonding and stability
Top, a G.C base pair with three hydrogen bonds. Bottom, an A.T base pair with two hydrogen bonds. Non-covalent hydrogen bonds between the bases are shown as dashed lines. The wiggly lines stand for the connection to the pentose sugar and point in the direction of the minor groove. 

Hydrogen bonding is the chemical interaction that underlies the base-pairing rules described above. Appropriate geometrical correspondence of hydrogen bond donors and acceptors allows only the "right" pairs to form stably. DNA with high GC-content is more stable than DNA with low GC-content. But, contrary to popular belief, the hydrogen bonds do not stabilize the DNA significantly; stabilization is mainly due to stacking interactions.

The bigger nucleobases, adenine and guanine, are members of a class of double-ringed chemical structures called purines; the smaller nucleobases, cytosine and thymine (and uracil), are members of a class of single-ringed chemical structures called pyrimidines. Purines are complementary only with pyrimidines: pyrimidine-pyrimidine pairings are energetically unfavorable because the molecules are too far apart for hydrogen bonding to be established; purine-purine pairings are energetically unfavorable because the molecules are too close, leading to overlap repulsion. Purine-pyrimidine base-pairing of AT or GC or UA (in RNA) results in proper duplex structure. The only other purine-pyrimidine pairings would be AC and GT and UG (in RNA); these pairings are mismatches because the patterns of hydrogen donors and acceptors do not correspond. The GU pairing, with two hydrogen bonds, does occur fairly often in RNA (see wobble base pair).

Paired DNA and RNA molecules are comparatively stable at room temperature, but the two nucleotide strands will separate above a melting point that is determined by the length of the molecules, the extent of mispairing (if any), and the GC content. Higher GC content results in higher melting temperatures; it is, therefore, unsurprising that the genomes of extremophile organisms such as Thermus thermophilus are particularly GC-rich. On the converse, regions of a genome that need to separate frequently — for example, the promoter regions for often-transcribed genes — are comparatively GC-poor (for example, see TATA box). GC content and melting temperature must also be taken into account when designing  primers for PCR reactions.

Examples
The following DNA sequences illustrate pair double-stranded patterns. By convention, the top strand is written from the 5′-end to the 3′-end; thus, the bottom strand is written 3′ to 5′.

A base-paired DNA sequence:

The corresponding RNA sequence, in which uracil is substituted for thymine in the RNA strand:

Base analogs and intercalators

Chemical analogs of nucleotides can take the place of proper nucleotides and establish non-canonical base-pairing, leading to errors (mostly point mutations) in DNA replication and DNA transcription. This is due to their isosteric chemistry. One common mutagenic base analog is 5-bromouracil, which resembles thymine but can base-pair to guanine in its enol form.

Other chemicals, known as DNA intercalators, fit into the gap between adjacent bases on a single strand and induce frameshift mutations by "masquerading" as a base, causing the DNA replication machinery to skip or insert additional nucleotides at the intercalated site. Most intercalators are large polyaromatic compounds and are known or suspected carcinogens. Examples include ethidium bromide and acridine.

Mismatch repair

Mismatched base pairs can be generated by errors of DNA replication and as intermediates during homologous recombination. The process of mismatch repair ordinarily must recognize and correctly repair a small number of base mispairs within a long sequence of normal DNA base pairs.  To repair mismatches formed during DNA replication, several distinctive repair processes have evolved to distinguish between the template strand and the newly formed strand so that only the newly inserted incorrect nucleotide is removed (in order to avoid generating a mutation).  The proteins employed in mismatch repair during DNA replication, and the clinical significance of defects in this process are described in the article DNA mismatch repair.  The process of mispair correction during recombination is described in the article gene conversion.

Length measurements

The following abbreviations are commonly used to describe the length of a D/RNA molecule:
 bp  = base pair—one bp corresponds to approximately 3.4 Å (340 pm)  of length along the strand, and to roughly 618 or 643 daltons for DNA and RNA respectively.
 kb (= kbp) = kilo–base-pair = 1,000 bp
 Mb (= Mbp) = mega–base-pair = 1,000,000 bp
 Gb = giga–base-pair = 1,000,000,000 bp.

For single-stranded DNA/RNA, units of nucleotides are used—abbreviated nt (or knt, Mnt, Gnt)—as they are not paired.
To distinguish between units of computer storage and bases, kbp, Mbp, Gbp, etc. may be used for base pairs.

The centimorgan is also often used to imply distance along a chromosome, but the number of base pairs it corresponds to varies widely. In the human genome, the centimorgan is about 1 million base pairs.

Unnatural base pair (UBP)

An unnatural base pair (UBP) is a designed subunit (or nucleobase) of DNA which is created in a laboratory and does not occur in nature.  DNA sequences have been described which use newly created nucleobases to form a third base pair, in addition to the two base pairs found in nature, A-T (adenine – thymine) and G-C (guanine – cytosine).  A few research groups have been searching for a third base pair for DNA, including teams led by Steven A. Benner, Philippe Marliere, Floyd E. Romesberg and Ichiro Hirao. Some new base pairs based on alternative hydrogen bonding, hydrophobic interactions and metal coordination have been reported.

In 1989 Steven Benner (then working at the Swiss Federal Institute of Technology in Zurich) and his team led with modified forms of cytosine and guanine into DNA molecules in vitro. The nucleotides, which encoded RNA and proteins, were successfully replicated in vitro. Since then, Benner's team has been trying to engineer cells that can make foreign bases from scratch, obviating the need for a feedstock.

In 2002, Ichiro Hirao's group in Japan developed an unnatural base pair between 2-amino-8-(2-thienyl)purine (s) and pyridine-2-one (y) that functions in transcription and translation, for the site-specific incorporation of non-standard amino acids into proteins. In 2006, they created 7-(2-thienyl)imidazo[4,5-b]pyridine (Ds) and pyrrole-2-carbaldehyde (Pa) as a third base pair for replication and transcription. Afterward, Ds and 4-[3-(6-aminohexanamido)-1-propynyl]-2-nitropyrrole (Px) was discovered as a high fidelity pair in PCR amplification. In 2013, they applied the Ds-Px pair to DNA aptamer generation by in vitro selection (SELEX) and demonstrated the genetic alphabet expansion significantly augment DNA aptamer affinities to target proteins.

In 2012, a group of American scientists led by Floyd Romesberg, a chemical biologist at the Scripps Research Institute in San Diego, California, published that his team designed an unnatural base pair (UBP).  The two new artificial nucleotides or Unnatural Base Pair (UBP) were named d5SICS and dNaM. More technically, these artificial nucleotides bearing hydrophobic nucleobases, feature two fused aromatic rings that form a (d5SICS–dNaM) complex or base pair in DNA. His team designed a variety of in vitro or "test tube" templates containing the unnatural base pair and they confirmed that it was efficiently replicated with high fidelity in virtually all sequence contexts using the modern standard in vitro techniques, namely PCR amplification of DNA and PCR-based applications. Their results show that for PCR and PCR-based applications, the d5SICS–dNaM unnatural base pair is functionally equivalent to a natural base pair, and when combined with the other two natural base pairs used by all organisms, A–T and G–C, they provide a fully functional and expanded six-letter "genetic alphabet".

In 2014 the same team from the Scripps Research Institute reported that they synthesized a stretch of circular DNA known as a plasmid containing natural T-A and C-G base pairs along with the best-performing UBP Romesberg's laboratory had designed and inserted it into cells of the common bacterium E. coli that successfully replicated the unnatural base pairs through multiple generations. The transfection did not hamper the growth of the E. coli cells and showed no sign of losing its unnatural base pairs to its natural DNA repair mechanisms. This is the first known example of a living organism passing along an expanded genetic code to subsequent generations. Romesberg said he and his colleagues created 300 variants to refine the design of nucleotides that would be stable enough and would be replicated as easily as the natural ones when the cells divide.  This was in part achieved by the addition of a supportive algal gene that expresses a nucleotide triphosphate transporter which efficiently imports the triphosphates of both d5SICSTP and dNaMTP into E. coli bacteria. Then, the natural bacterial replication pathways use them to accurately replicate a plasmid containing d5SICS–dNaM. Other researchers were surprised that the bacteria replicated these human-made DNA subunits.

The successful incorporation of a third base pair is a significant breakthrough toward the goal of greatly expanding the number of amino acids which can be encoded by DNA, from the existing 20 amino acids to a theoretically possible 172, thereby expanding the potential for living organisms to produce novel proteins. The artificial strings of DNA do not encode for anything yet, but scientists speculate they could be designed to manufacture new proteins which could have industrial or pharmaceutical uses. Experts said the synthetic DNA incorporating the unnatural base pair raises the possibility of life forms based on a different DNA code.

Non-canonical base pairing 

In addition to the canonical pairing, some conditions can also favour base-pairing with alternative base orientation, and number and geometry of hydrogen bonds. These pairings are accompanied by alterations to the local backbone shape.

The most common of these is the wobble base pairing that occurs between tRNAs and mRNAs at the third base position of many codons during transcription and during the charging of tRNAs by some tRNA synthetases. They have also been observed in the secondary structures of some RNA sequences.

Additionally, Hoogsteen base pairing (typically written as A•U/T and G•C) can exist in some DNA sequences (e.g. CA and TA dinucleotides) in dynamic equilibrium with standard Watson–Crick pairing. They have also been observed in some protein–DNA complexes.

In addition to these alternative base pairings, a wide range of base-base hydrogen bonding is observed in RNA secondary and tertiary structure. These bonds are often necessary for the precise, complex shape of an RNA, as well as its binding to interaction partners.

See also 
 List of Y-DNA single-nucleotide polymorphisms
 Non-canonical base pairing
 Chargaff's rules

References

Further reading 

  (See esp. ch. 6 and 9)

External links 

 DAN—webserver version of the EMBOSS tool for calculating melting temperatures

Nucleobases
Molecular genetics
Nucleic acids